Pekka Aleksander Myllylä (born 7 July 1932) is a Finnish ice hockey goalkeeper. He competed in the men's tournament at the 1952 Winter Olympics. In Finland, he represented team Ilves during 1950–1958 and won the Finnish Championship three times. (1951, 1952 and 1957). He also played in the national ice hockey team five times. He was born in Tampere.

References

External links
 

1932 births
Possibly living people
Finnish ice hockey players
Ice hockey players at the 1952 Winter Olympics
Ice hockey people from Tampere
Ilves players
Olympic ice hockey players of Finland